Scarborough Centre may refer to:

 Scarborough Centre station, a station on the Toronto Subway
 Scarborough Centre Bus Terminal, an intercity coach terminal in Toronto, Canada
 Scarborough City Centre, a business district and neighbourhood in Toronto, Canada
 Scarborough Town Centre, a shopping mall in Toronto, Canada
 Scarborough Centre (electoral district), a federal electoral district in Toronto, Canada
 Scarborough Centre (provincial electoral district), a provincial electoral district in Toronto, Canada

See also
 Scarborough railway station, also known as "Scarborough Central", North Yorkshire, England